Alessio Rasi (born 4 August 1999) is an Italian professional footballer who plays as a left back for Roma City.

Club career
Born in Rome, Rasi started his career in GSD Nuova Tor Tre Teste.

On 19 July 2017, Rasi joined Serie D club Monterosi.

After two seasons in Monterosi, on 22 July 2019 he signed with Serie C club AlbinoLeffe. Rasi made his professional debut on 8 September 2019 against Pro Vercelli.

On 31 January 2020, he was loaned to Rieti for the rest of the season.

For the 2020–21 season, he signed with Vibonese.

On 3 August 2021, he moved to Pescara of Serie C.

On 15 December 2022, Rasi joined Roma City in Serie D.

References

External links
 
 

1999 births
Living people
Footballers from Rome
Italian footballers
Association football fullbacks
Serie C players
Serie D players
U.C. AlbinoLeffe players
F.C. Rieti players
U.S. Vibonese Calcio players
Delfino Pescara 1936 players
A.S.D. Roma City F.C. players